Politzer is a surname deriving from Politz. Notable people with the surname include:

 Adam Politzer, Hungarian physician
Politzerization, a treatment technique for ear infections, developed by him
 Georges Politzer, French philosopher
 H. David Politzer, American physicist
 Heinz Politzer, Austrian writer
 Kerry Politzer, American pianist
 Rózsa Péter (1905–1977), born Rózsa Politzer, a Hungarian mathematician

See also 
 Pollitzer
 Pulitzer (disambiguation)
 Pölitz, Pomerania